Carroll Creek is a stream in the U.S. state of Missouri. It is a tributary of Clear Creek.

Carroll Creek has the name of a pioneer citizen.

See also
List of rivers of Missouri

References

Rivers of Clay County, Missouri
Rivers of Clinton County, Missouri
Rivers of Missouri